"Candidatus Caballeronia crenata" is a bacterium from the genus of Caballeronia and the family Burkholderiaceae.

References

Burkholderiaceae
Bacteria described in 2011
Candidatus taxa